Princess Camilla may refer to:

 Camilla, Princess of Wales, wife and later queen consort of Charles III
 Princess Camilla, Duchess of Castro

See also 
Princess Camille
Lady Camilla (disambiguation)